The St. Johns and Lake Eustis Railway was a historic railroad in northern Central Florida.  It ran from Astor on the St. Johns River south to Fort Mason and along Lake Eustis to Tavares and Lane Park.  It also had track from Fort Mason to Leesburg, where it connected to the Florida Southern Railway.

History

The St. Johns and Lake Eustis Railway was chartered in 1879 and construction started at Astor on the St. Johns River. The line was built  narrow gauge and its rails passed through Altoona, Umatilla, and Fort Mason before reaching Eustis, 27 miles, in 1880. Construction continued southward through Tavares, reaching Lane Park on Big Lake Harris, 7.5 miles, in 1882–83. The line was then extended 15 miles from Fort Mason, around the north and west sides of Lake Eustis to Leesburg in 1884. The line originally served as a land bridge for the river and lake steamboats that provided transportation into the interior of Florida. Passengers and freight could come down the St. Johns River on steamboats from Jacksonville and transfer to the railroad at Astor for ports on Lakes Eustis, Dora and Harris. They could then transfer back to a lake steamer to continue to points further south.

The St. Johns and Lake Eustis Railway was leased to the Florida Southern Railway, a  narrow gauge system, from 1885 to 1889 and subleased to the Jacksonville, Tampa and Key West Railway from 1889 to 1890. The lease was cancelled in 1890 and the St. Johns and Lake Eustis Railway resumed operations until 1893. They went into bankruptcy in 1893 and were operated by a receiver until they were sold to the Plant System in 1896. Railroad tycoon Henry Plant reorganized it as the St. Johns and Lake Eustis Railroad and immediately converted the tracks to standard gauge. It was operated as a part of his Plant System as the Savannah, Florida & Western Railroad Company until his death. His family, having no interest in his railroad empire, sold it to the Atlantic Coast Line Railroad in 1902.  The Atlantic Coast Line designated the line from Leesburg to Astor as the SC Branch and the line from Fort Mason to Lane Park as the SD Branch.  The line from Leesburg to Tavares would also be known as the Leesburg Branch, which continued east to Sanford along the former Sanford and Lake Eustis Railway (also owned by the Atlantic Coast Line).

Abandonments began in 1941 with the portion of the line from Astor to Altoona, 17.7 miles. The line from Tavares to Lane Park, 1.5 miles, followed in 1942. Then in 1956 the portion from Altoona to Umatilla, 3 miles, was abandoned. These abandonments were due to a loss of a customer base.

By 1949, the Atlantic Coast Line was running only one mixed train six days a week on the remaining line from Tavares and Leesburg, which originated in Sanford.

The Atlantic Coast Line operated the line until 1967 when they merged with the Seaboard Air Line Railroad to form the Seaboard Coast Line Railroad.  The line from Fort Mason to Leesburg, 15 miles, was abandoned in 1967 due to being redundant after the merger.

Today, the line is still in service between Umatilla and Tavares and is operated by the Florida Central Railroad.

Historic stations

References

1879 establishments in Florida
Defunct Florida railroads
Predecessors of the Atlantic Coast Line Railroad
Railway companies established in 1879
Railway companies disestablished in 1896
Atlantic Coast Line Railroad